Rambler Peak is a mountain located on Vancouver Island, British Columbia.

This mountain is a hydrographic divide located at the headwaters of the Elk River.  The Wolf, Elk, Ucoma Rivers and Cervus Creek all start at Rambler Peak.

History
The difficulty in scaling this peak defeated attempts for many years.  The first successful attempt was July 19, 1964 when Cameron Powell, Barrie McDowell and Steve Todd of the Island Ramblers Mountaineering Club reached the top.  The mountain was named in honour of their club. Rambler peak was originally called El Piveto Mountain a name by which another BC mountain is now known.

References

Sources

External links
 Photo of Rambler Peak at Island Ramblers Web Site

Two-thousanders of British Columbia
Vancouver Island Ranges
Nootka Land District